Tanjier are an alternative synth-pop four-piece based in Dublin, Ireland. Formed in autumn 2015, the group have risen quickly through the ranks generating a substantial fan-base in a relatively short space of time. They were the overall winners of the RTÉ 2FM and Oxfam's Play the Picnic competition 2016 having beaten four hundred odd entries. They have been selected as an Irish Artist of the Week   by Dublinconcerts.ie and were selected by Whelans and State Magazine as one of the thirty acts to watch in 2016. Tanjier are described as 'an incredible live act'  with a sound that is 'so dark and alluring, haunting and rife with meaning'. They blend synth-pop, indie-rock, electro-pop, and funk, 'resulting in a sound that feels both modern and yet has the elegance and grace of a bygone era'.

References

Musical groups from Dublin (city)